Hadji Panglima Tahil, officially the Municipality of Hadji Panglima Tahil (Tausūg: Kawman sin Hadji Panglima Tahil), is a 6th class municipality in the province of Sulu, Philippines. According to the 2020 census, it has a population of 7,906 people.

It is formerly known as Marunggas.

As of 2000, it was the poorest municipality in the Philippines with a poverty incidence estimate of 89.7%.

Geography

Barangays
Hadji Panglima Tahil is politically subdivided into 5 barangays.
 Bangas (Poblacion)
 Bubuan
 Kabuukan
 Pag-asinan
 Teomabal

Climate

Demographics

Economy

References

External links

 [ Philippine Standard Geographic Code]
 Hadji Panglima Tahil Profile at the DTI Cities and Municipalities Competitive Index
 Philippine Census Information
 Local Governance Performance Management System 

Municipalities of Sulu
Island municipalities in the Philippines